On Air is the second solo studio album by English rock musician Alan Parsons. The album's chief creative force was the Alan Parsons Project's long-time guitarist, Ian Bairnson. Its concept revolves around the history of airborne exploration.

Musically, this album is somewhat different from Try Anything Once and the Alan Parsons Project albums, opting for more of a soft rock sound and a more stable band line-up rather than the funky rhythms, symphonic flares, or rotating vocalists of the past.

Concept 
The album follows the history of airborne exploration, from the mythological flight of Daedalus and Icarus to escape the labyrinth of the Minotaur in "Too Close to the Sun", through Leonardo da Vinci's search to design a flying machine, or ornithopter, in long-time Project drummer Stuart Elliott's "One Day To Fly", until finally mankind's aspirations for space exploration placed on the shoulders of a single astronaut in "So Far Away" and the subsequent superpower race to put a man on the moon in "Apollo", a track backed by John F. Kennedy's famous speech of 25 May 1961.

The song "Brother Up In Heaven" remembers Ian Bairnson's cousin Erik Mounsey who was killed in a friendly fire incident above Iraq in 1994. "Fall Free" is inspired by skysurfer Rob Harris, who died in 1995. "So Far Away" also references the Challenger tragedy in 1986 in its last verse.

Release 
On Air was issued as both a stereo CD and a 5.1 channel dts mix. Included with the music CD was a CD-ROM exploring the On Air theme.

Track listing

Several additional remixes of "Apollo" were released on 12" singles.

Personnel
 Alan Parsons – keyboards (tracks 2, 4, 8), mixing, engineering
 Andrew Powell – orchestral arranger and conductor
 Ian Bairnson – guitars, bass synthesizer (4), bass guitar (6)
 John Giblin – bass guitar
 Stuart Elliott – drums, bongos (11), keyboards and drum programming (8)
 Richard Cottle – saxophone (2), keyboards (2, 5, 7, 8)
 Gary Sanctuary – keyboards
 Christopher Warren-Green – orchestra leader
 Eric Stewart – lead vocals (tracks 1, 3, 11)
 Neil Lockwood – lead vocals (tracks 2, 5, 6)
 Steve Overland – lead vocals (track 7)
 Christopher Cross – lead vocals (track 9)
 Graham Dye – lead vocals (track 10)
 Peter Beckett – backing vocals (track 6)
 Storm Thorgerson – cover design

Charts

Notes

External links 
 The test for your surround system
 On Air at the official Ian Bairnson website
 Eagle Flight Memorial
 The Military Verdict

Parsons, Alan
Concept albums
1996 albums
Albums with cover art by Storm Thorgerson
Albums produced by Alan Parsons
Albums about aircraft